Association of the Royal Residences of Europe is an international organisation.

The main goal is "develop and manage the network of European Royal Residences", like they put online.
The network was created in 1996 by the Chateau de Versailes and in 2001 between 19 former royal institutions. Each year a meeting is organised for the members.

19 members 
 Stiftung Preussische Schlösser und Gärten Berlin-Brandenburg, Germany
 Schloss Schönbrunn Kultur- und Betriebsges.m.b.H., Austria 
 Palais de Charles Quint asbl, Belgium 
 De Danske Kongers Kronologiske saml Rosenborg Slot, Denmark
 Patrimonio Nacional, Spain 
 Etablissement Public du musée et du domaine national de Versailles, France 
 Établissement public du domaine national de Chambord, France 
 Gödöllői Királyi Kastély Kht, Hungary 
 Regione Piemonte (Direzione Cultura, Turismo e Sport), Italy 
 Ministero per i Beni e le Attività Culturali, Italy 
 Paleis Het Loo Nationaal Museum, The Netherlands 
 Muzeum Pałac w Wilanowie, Poland 
 Palácio Nacional de Mafra, Portugal 
 Historic Royal Palaces, United Kingdom 
 Royal Collections Kungl. Slottet, Sweden

Website 
 https://web.archive.org/web/20171029141626/http://dehrr.patrimonionacional.es/en_index.html

References